The Wuling Xingchi is a subcompact crossover SUV produced by SAIC-GM-Wuling through the Wuling brand. It was introduced in September 2022 as the smallest SUV model of the brand under the Asta/Xingchen.

Overview
The Wuling Xingchi is the fourth model that is equipped Wuling’s global silver badge, the Xingchi small crossover inherits the brand’s "dynamic wing" design DNA. It is offered in six trim levels in China.

The interior of the Wuling Xingchi is equipped with a 10.25-inch floating central control screen and a 3.5-inch instrument panel. The central control screen comes with the Ling OS System and supports functions including voice interaction, remote control, and OTA update.

Powertrain
The  acceleration time is 8.7 seconds.

Wuling Alvez 
In Indonesia, the Xingchi is sold as the Wuling Alvez, which was launched on 16 February 2023 at the 30th Indonesia International Motor Show. The Alvez is available in SE, CE and EX grade levels. The SE grade is available with 6-speed manual transmission, while the CE and EX grades are available with CVT.

References

External links 

Xingchi
Cars introduced in 2022
Mini sport utility vehicles
Crossover sport utility vehicles
Front-wheel-drive vehicles
Vehicles with CVT transmission
Cars of China